This is a list of women who have served as members of the European Parliament representing Cyprus.

Cyprus as of the 9th European Parliament, currently has no female members serving as MEPS for the first time since 2009.

List of female members of the European Parliament for Cyprus

Sources 

2019
List
Cyprus
Lists of women Members of the European Parliament